Wilson Estiben Peña Molano (born 7 April 1998) is a Colombian cyclist, who currently rides for UCI Continental team .

Major results
2021
 1st  Overall 
1st Stage 1 (ITT)
 2nd Overall Vuelta a Boyacá
1st Stage 3
 3rd Overall Clásico RCN
2022
 1st  Overall Vuelta al Tolima
1st Stage 4
 2nd Overall 
 4th Overall Vuelta a Colombia

References

External links

1998 births
Living people
Colombian male cyclists
People from Zipaquirá
21st-century Colombian people